Han Kum-ok (born 22 September 1987 in Pyongyang) is a North Korean freestyle wrestler. She competed in the freestyle 55 kg event at the 2012 Summer Olympics and was eliminated in the 1/8 finals by Jackeline Rentería.

References

External links
 

1987 births
Living people
North Korean female sport wrestlers
Olympic wrestlers of North Korea
Wrestlers at the 2012 Summer Olympics
Sportspeople from Pyongyang
20th-century North Korean women
21st-century North Korean women